Behind the Enigma: The Authorised History of GCHQ, Britain's Secret Cyber-Intelligence Agency  is an authorised history of GCHQ, written by intelligence and security expert John Ferris. It was published on 20 October 2020 by Bloomsbury Publishing.

Reception 
Lawrence D. Freedman, reviewing from Foreign Affairs, commented that the book's judgement on Bletchley Park's influence was "careful". However, the book's engagement was critiqued by The Guardian, which described it as "deeply technical in places and largely lacking in colour or human drama", despite praising the coverage of intelligence during the Falklands War. The book was also reviewed by The Times and Cryptologia.

References

2020 non-fiction books
English non-fiction books
English-language books
Bloomsbury Publishing books